The Cabinet of Ghana is the Executive Branch of the Government of Ghana. The Cabinet members are appointed by the President and report to the President. The Cabinet is constituted in conformity with Article 76 (1) of the 1992 Constitution of Ghana. The Constitution enjoins the President to have a Cabinet of no fewer than 10 and not more than 19 ministers.

Current cabinet

See also
Government of Ghana

References